Trick or Treaty? is a 2014 Canadian documentary feature film by Alanis Obomsawin about Treaty 9, a 1905 agreement in which First Nations peoples in northern Ontario surrendered their sovereign rights. The film is the first by an indigenous filmmaker to be selected to the Masters program at the Toronto International Film Festival, and is the 43rd film by Obomsawin for the National Film Board of Canada.

Content
In the film, Obomsawin interviews Nipissing University professor John Long, author of the book Treaty No. 9: Making the Agreement to Share the Land in Far Northern Ontario in 1905, Stan Louttit, Grand Chief of the Mushkegowuk Council, and others about whether First Nations signatories were deceived by treaty commissioners, who offered oral promises that were not included in the final written agreement.  The documentary places significant focus on the way the treaty was interpreted by First Nations peoples and the Canadian government.  Often referencing two versions of the treaty: the written version, and the oral version.   The documentary offers insight into how treaties can be interpreted and poses the question of who has the right to interpret a treaty? The film also looks at efforts today by the Idle No More movement to fight for First Nations rights and documents the Nishiyuu, a 1,600 kilometre (990 mi) by a group of Cree youth from the Eeyou Istchee to the Canadian capital in the winter of 2013 to bring their concerns to Parliament Hill. The film's closing sequence is set to John Trudell's song "Crazy Horse."

Release
Louttit, described by Obomsawin as the inspiration to make Trick or Treaty?, died several months before the film's premiere at the Toronto International Film Festival, on September 5, 2014. Obomsawin has said she planned to make the film after Louttit had informed her of plans to re-enact the 1905 signing of the treaty. Louttit's headdress was placed by an empty chair at the Toronto premiere by Obomsawin.

Further reading

References

External links
Trick or Treaty? at the Toronto International Film Festival
Trick or Treaty? at the National Film Board of Canada

2014 films
2014 documentary films
Films directed by Alanis Obomsawin
National Film Board of Canada documentaries
Documentary films about Indigenous rights in Canada
First Nations history in Ontario
Nishnawbe Aski Nation
Idle No More
2010s Canadian films